Andrés Josué Romero Tocuyo (born 7 March 2003) is a Venezuelan footballer who plays as a midfielder for Monagas.

International career
Romero made his debut for the Venezuela national football team on 27 September 2022 in a friendly game against the United Arab Emirates.

Career statistics

Club

Notes

References

External links
 

2003 births
Living people
People from Maturín
People from Monagas
Venezuelan footballers
Venezuela under-20 international footballers
Venezuela international footballers
Association football midfielders
Venezuelan Primera División players
Monagas S.C. players
21st-century Venezuelan people